The 2018–19 season was the 139th season of competitive association football in England.

National teams

England national football team

Kits

Results and fixtures

Friendlies

2018–19 UEFA Nations League A

Group 4

2019 UEFA Nations League Finals

UEFA Euro 2020 qualifying

Group A

England U-21 national football team

2019 UEFA European Under-21 Championship qualification

Group 4

2019 UEFA European Under-21 Championship

The final draw was held on 23 November 2018, 18:00 CET (UTC+1), in Bologna. The 12 teams are drawn into three groups of four teams. Hosts Italy are assigned to position A1 in the draw, while the other teams are seeded according to their coefficient ranking following the end of the qualifying stage, calculated based on the following:

England U-19 national football team

2018 UEFA European Under-19 Championship

Group B

Knockout stage

England U-17 national football team

2019 UEFA European Under-17 Championship

Group B

England women's national football team

Results and fixtures

Friendlies

2019 FIFA Women's World Cup qualification (UEFA)

UEFA Group 1

2019 SheBelieves Cup

2019 FIFA Women's World Cup

Group D

Knockout stage

England women's national under-20 football team

2018 FIFA U-20 Women's World Cup

Group B

The official draw was held on 8 March 2018 at the Rennes Opera House in Rennes.

Knockout stage

England women's national under-17 football team

2019 UEFA Women's Under-17 Championship qualification

Group 5

UEFA competitions

UEFA Champions League

Group stage

Group B

Group C

Group F

Group H

Knockout phase

Round of 16

|}

Quarter-finals

|}
Notes

Semi-finals

|}

Final

The final was played on 1 June 2019 at the Wanda Metropolitano in Madrid. The "home" team (for administrative purposes) was determined by an additional draw held after the quarter-final and semi-final draws.
It was the second all-English final in the competition's history and the first since 2008.

UEFA Europa League

Qualifying phase and play-off round

Second qualifying round

|}

Third qualifying round

|}

Play-off round

|}

Group stage

Group E

Group L

Knockout phase

Round of 32

|}

Round of 16

|}

Quarter-finals

|}
Notes

Semi-finals

|}

Final

The final was played on 29 May 2019 at the Olympic Stadium in Baku. The "home" team (for administrative purposes) was determined by an additional draw held after the quarter-final and semi-final draws. It was the second all-English final in the competition's history and the first since 1972, when it was first known as the UEFA Cup.

UEFA Youth League

UEFA Champions League Path

Group B

Group C

Group F

Group H

Domestic Champions Path

First round

|}

Second round

|}

Play-offs

|}

Knockout phase

Round of 16

|}

Quarter-finals

|}

Semi-finals

|}

Final

The final was played on 29 April 2019 at Colovray Stadium, Nyon.

UEFA Women's Champions League

Knockout phase

Round of 32

|}

Round of 16

|}

Quarter-finals

|}

Semi-finals

|}

Men's football

Premier League 

In one of the closest title races since the formation of the Premier League, with a new points total set for finishing second, Manchester City became the first top-flight team in a decade to retain their title in part thanks to a late run that saw them win their last 14 games – despite falling short in the Champions League, the Sky Blues became the first team in English football to complete a domestic treble, by once again retaining the League Cup and securing their first FA Cup since 2011.

The battle for the top four also proved to be a close-run battle, with each of Tottenham Hotspur, Arsenal, Chelsea and Manchester United fighting for the last two Champions League spots – in the end, securing the spots for Europe's elite competition were Chelsea, who also reached the final of the League Cup and won the Europa League to at least ensure a trophy but endured another disappointing league campaign that saw talk of a potential third title in five seasons rapidly fade away in the New Year, and Tottenham Hotspur, who also saw talk of a potential title win diminish owing in part to a poor run of league form from March onwards; however, the North London side more than made up for this by also reaching their first ever Champions League final in a European run that saw them narrowly edge past both Manchester City and Dutch front-runners Ajax, ultimately falling to fellow English side Liverpool in a tight final. Arsenal and Manchester United were forced to settle for fifth and sixth respectively, the Gunners missing out on Champions League qualification once again on two different fronts, falling to Chelsea in the Europa League final to mark a disappointing end to Unai Emery's first season in charge, whilst the Red Devils endured a problematic season across all tournaments with even the sacking of manager José Mourinho and then the temporary appointment of United legend Ole Gunnar Solskjær (an act later made permanent) failing to provide much spark to the Manchester side.

Wolverhampton Wanderers enjoyed the best top-flight season for a newly promoted side since Ipswich Town in 2001, finishing 7th; this represented their best finish in the English pyramid since finishing 6th in 1980. 7th was also enough for the Europa League qualifying rounds, and this, added to a run to the semi-finals of the FA Cup - their longest such run in 21 years - earned Portuguese manager Nuno Espírito Santo and his team plenty of praise. Leicester City endured a troubling season both on and off the pitch, first suffering tragedy with the death of club owner Vichai Srivaddhanaprabha in a helicopter crash shortly after a 1-1 home draw with West Ham United – with the Foxes then enduring a run of poor results against lesser sides in 2019, including a third-round FA Cup exit at the hands of League Two side Newport County, resulting in the dismissal of manager Claude Puel; however, the appointment of former Liverpool manager Brendan Rodgers helped push the club back up the table and to a top-ten finish.

Watford finished not far behind the Foxes, also enjoying their greatest top-flight season since finishing 2nd in 1984, the Hornets breaking the 50 point barrier and narrowly missing out on the top ten on top of reaching the final of the FA Cup for the first time in over 30 years, ultimately failing at the hands of Manchester City. Having successfully qualified for the qualifying rounds of the Europa League the previous season, Burnley endured a troublesome first half of the campaign that saw them first narrowly miss out on a Europa League group stage spot and then find themselves firmly in the relegation zone at Christmas; however, the return of influential goalkeeper Tom Heaton after Boxing Day saw the Clarets fight their way out of the bottom three with games to spare. A very poor start to the season saw Southampton stuck in a relegation battle for the second season running, resulting in the dismissal of Mark Hughes in early December – despite the threat of the drop hanging over them until the closing months, a resurgence under former RB Leipzig manager and Austrian Ralph Hasenhüttl saw the Saints climb away from the bottom three and towards safety with games to spare.

At the bottom of the table, both Huddersfield Town and Fulham endured early relegations – the two clubs never really looking like escaping the drop; whilst the Terriers (who arguably found themselves suffering from second season syndrome) saved some face by narrowly avoiding breaking the records for the most defeats and most goals conceded in a 38-game season, the London side fell back into the Championship at the first time of asking in almost similar fashion to their previous top-flight season by having three different managers throughout the campaign and conceding more goals than anyone else. The fight to avoid the final spot proved to be much closer, with Cardiff City once again falling back into the second tier after just one season – a consequence of a poor start to the season and several defeats from winnable games, though the Bluebirds at least went down fighting in a season also marked with off-field tragedy, with the death of club record signing Emiliano Sala on his way to joining the team for the first time; in addition, as a result of Cardiff's relegation and Swansea's failure to mount a real promotion charge, it meant that the Premier League would not have a Welsh presence for the first time in nine seasons.

Championship 

Despite making a slow start to the season on top of losing star player James Maddison to Leicester City in the summer, Norwich City secured their third promotion to the Premier League in eight seasons – whilst a late run of draws in April threatened to derail the Canaries' hopes, the Norfolk side never looked like falling out of the top two and secured promotion in German head coach Daniel Farke's second season in charge. The battle for second place went down to the wire between Yorkshire sides Leeds United and Sheffield United – but it was ultimately the Blades who won the fight, securing their second promotion in three seasons and returning to the top-flight for the first time since 2007, earning manager Chris Wilder his first taste of the top-flight; as with the previous few seasons, a horrendous late-season run ultimately proved costly to Leeds, to the point where they only even managed to finish as high as third due to West Bromwich Albion failing to win their own final game of the season; both teams were subsequently knocked out in the play-off semi-finals. Instead taking the final promotion spot were Aston Villa in what proved to be a roller coaster campaign, the Villans making amends for their play-off final loss the previous season and ending a three-year absence from the top-flight in Dean Smith's first season as manager - at the expense of Derby County, who none-the-less enjoyed a fantastic season under new manager Frank Lampard.

Swansea City's first season in the Championship since 2011 saw them stuck mostly in mid-table – with growing fan protests off-field towards the running of the club that had seen them relegated resulting in the resignation of the Swans' long-time chairman Huw Jenkins in early 2019. Likewise, having been widely tipped to win promotion back to the top-flight at the first attempt, Stoke City endured a largely mediocre league season that saw them fight more to avoid relegation rather than win promotion, draw a staggering 22 times and change managers twice. Having made a strong start to their league season, a collapse in form nearly saw Wigan Athletic relegated from the second tier for the third time in five seasons; however, the Manchester-based club recovered enough in the second half of the season to escape the drop and ensure a second successive season on the second level of league football.

After 17 consecutive seasons in the second tier and a succession of mid-table finishes, Ipswich Town's luck finally gave out and they endured relegation to the third tier for the first time in 62 years, the Tractor Boys never really looking like escaping the drop after falling to the foot of the table in early October and with only five wins all season. Bolton Wanderers finished just above them, falling back into League One on Good Friday after two seasons and in a campaign full of struggle both on and off the pitch, amid severe financial problems on top of nearly having their last run of home games cancelled altogether (and then actually having their last home game against Brentford cancelled); to make matters worse, the Trotters were then forced into administration after the season ended, becoming the first club to have the increased 12-point deduction imposed on them for the following season. Taking the final spot were Rotherham United, who gave themselves a decent chance of escaping the drop, but eventually fell back into the third tier for the second time in three seasons, the Yorkshire club ultimately being let down once again by their atrocious away record - just one win on the road, and one win in their last 48 second tier away games - and a failure to turn any one of their 16 draws into wins or take advantage of their relegation rivals slipping up.

League One 

In one of the most remarkable campaigns of the season and in spite of losing influential manager Nathan Jones to Stoke City in January, Luton Town defied their critics and stormed their way to promotion for the second season running, returning to the Championship for the first time since 2007 and going up as champions – whilst remaining unbeaten at their home ground in the league for the entire season. The fight for the second spot went all the way to the penultimate game with Barnsley, Football League Trophy winners Portsmouth and Sunderland fighting it out; the spot ultimately went to Barnsley, who secured an immediate return to the second-tier in German head coach Daniel Stendel's first season in charge, also impressing with an unbeaten league home record as well. Taking the final promotion place were Charlton Athletic, who dramatically scored in the last minute of normal time against Sunderland in the playoff final to end a 3-year exile from the Championship and consign the Black Cats to another season in League One.

Despite being widely tipped for a top-six finish, Burton Albion endured a largely mixed season that saw them in the bottom half of the table more often than the top, failing to really challenge for an immediate return to the second tier. Blackpool's league season proved to be mediocre, with the Lancashire club failing to mount a real promotion challenge but also not being remotely threatened with relegation – however, it was off the pitch that proved to be more important for the Seasiders, with the removal of Owen Oyston after over 30 years as owner and after years of fan protests and legal battles with former chairman Valērijs Belokoņs, an act widely celebrated by Blackpool fans. Despite making a reasonable start to their first ever season in the third tier, Accrington Stanley endured a sharp drop in form after the new year, with only a run of late wins pushing the side away from the threat of relegation – still a remarkable effort for the Lancashire side.

The second half of the season saw one of the tightest relegation battles in the history of the third tier, with 12 teams remaining in the mix from January onwards – but ultimately, it was Bradford City, Scunthorpe United, Walsall and Plymouth Argyle who fell into League Two; whilst Bradford's relegation came just two years after narrowly missing out on promotion to the Championship and in a season where they had three different managers and Scunthorpe United fell back into the fourth tier after five years in League One, Walsall had actually spent the first couple of weeks challenging for promotion before results rapidly declined and Plymouth Argyle again looked like masterminding an unlikely escape from the drop like they had done the previous campaign, only for results to go against them in the final games of the season. Having been in bottom position for nearly the entire season and 10 points from avoiding relegation after 31 games, a late run of 7 wins and 27 points in their last 15 games ensured that AFC Wimbledon would remain in League One for a fourth consecutive campaign, narrowly surviving on goal difference.

League Two 

Just two seasons after returning to the Football League as fifth tier champions and only one year after victory in the Football League Trophy, Lincoln City ended their season with another success to their name with promotion to League One and earning their first promotion to the third tier in over 20 years – despite the closeness of the promotion race, the Lincolnshire side remained in the top two for practically the entire season and mathematically secured first place on Easter Monday. The race for the remaining automatic promotions was a close-ran battle between Mansfield Town, Bury and Milton Keynes Dons; Bury were the second team to ensure promotion, returning to League One at the first attempt, whilst Milton Keynes Dons took the final spot in the last game of the campaign in a winner-takes-all match against Mansfield Town, also securing an immediate return to the third tier and finally giving new manager Paul Tisdale promotion after two unsuccessful play-off final attempts with Exeter City. Taking the final spot through the play-offs were Tranmere Rovers, whose return to the Football League saw the North West club successfully challenge for a second consecutive promotion, winning out against Newport County in the final at Wembley in the dying seconds of extra-time.

Despite narrowly missing out on ending a 32-year exile from the third tier, Newport County enjoyed what proved to be a great season; having looking like missing out on the play-offs altogether, the Welsh side made a late rally and edged their way into the top seven in their final game, a big achievement in a season where they also enjoyed an impressive FA Cup run that saw them make it to the fifth round – beating top-flight Leicester City and second-tier promotion-chasers Middlesbrough – before ultimately falling to Manchester City at Rodney Parade. Oldham Athletic made a strong start to their season before results rapidly fell aware and they fell into mid-table, with not even the appointment of former player Paul Scholes as manager (who then promptly resigned after 7 games) having much impact on the Latics.

In spite of having made a very poor start on their return to the Football League and then only narrowly avoiding breaking the record for the longest winless run, Macclesfield Town defied their critics and scraped their way to safety, in parts thanks to the surprise appointment of former England defender Sol Campbell as manager. Suffering relegation instead were Yeovil Town and Notts County – the Glovers falling out of the Football League just six years after winning promotion to the Championship and sixteen years after entering the fourth tier for the first time, a strong start to the season rapidly falling away in stunning fashion and the Magpies becoming the oldest club in English football to fall into non-league football, having been a member of the Football League since its inception 131 years previously and having never fallen out of the fourth tier before. This also made them the first of the Football League's founder members to suffer automatic relegation from the league, albeit with several of the others having lost (and later regained) their places under the previous election system.

National League Top Division 

In one of the tightest promotion races in the history of the fifth tier and just two seasons after their spectacular fall into non-league football, Leyton Orient finally returned to the Football League, never looking like falling out of the promotion race and narrowly edging the automatic promotion spot in manager Justin Edinburgh's first full season as manager; the season ended in tragedy, however, following Edinburgh's death from cardiac arrest the following month. In their first season in the fifth tier, Salford City narrowly missed out on automatic promotion - but made up for it by winning the play-offs, earning promotion to League Two and the Football League for the first time in their 79-year history.

Despite languishing near the bottom of the table for most of the season, a late surge in results saved Dover Athletic, while Chesterfield almost suffered a third consecutive relegation after a long winless run in the league stretching from August to December, before the appointment of veteran manager John Sheridan in the new year helped the club find form and move away from the bottom.

At the bottom of the table, all four relegated teams were confirmed with at least three games to go – Aldershot Town, Braintree Town, Havant and Waterlooville and Maidstone United. While both Braintree and Havant suffered immediate relegation back to the National League South, the second time in three seasons for the former, Aldershot Town's relegation came only six seasons after they had dropped out of League Two. Maidstone United had played at the highest level of the National League for three years. However, Aldershot were granted a reprieve from relegation when Gateshead were demoted two divisions (later reduced to one on appeal) for breaching the league's financial regulations.

League play-offs

Football League play-offs

EFL Championship

Final

EFL League One

Final

EFL League Two

Final

National League play-offs

National League

Final

National League North

Final

National League South

Final

Cup competitions

FA Cup

Final

EFL Cup

Final

Community Shield

EFL Trophy

Final

FA Trophy

Final

Women's football

League season

Women's Super League

Women's Championship

Cup competitions

FA Women's Cup

Final

FA Women's League Cup

Final

Managerial changes 
This is a list of changes of managers within English league football:

Diary of the season
3 August 2018: The first match of the Football League season pits Frank Lampard's Derby County against Reading. Jon Dadi Bodvarsson scores the first goal of the new season, but goals from Chelsea loanee Mason Mount and an injury-time winner from Tom Lawrence gives the Rams a 2–1 win.

4 August 2018: The first Saturday of the Football League season sees newly relegated West Brom lose 2–1 to a Bolton Wanderers side who were nearly relegated themselves last year. Among other Championship action, newly-promoted Wigan defeat Sheffield Wednesday 3–2, and Graham Potter makes a winning start as Swansea manager by beating Sheffield United 2–1 away. In League One, Sunderland come from behind to defeat Charlton 2–1 in their first game at this level in 30 years, and in League Two, Swindon Town stun newly-promoted Macclesfield 3–2 with two stoppage-time penalties.

6 August 2018: Blackpool manager Gary Bowyer becomes the first managerial casualty of the new season when handing in his resignation after just one game played. The Seasiders had travelled to Wycombe Wanderers for their season opener just a few days before and shared out a goalless draw in Buckinghamshire.

31 August 2018: The first month of the new season sees Liverpool leading the Premier League on goal difference; three games in, the Merseysiders, Tottenham Hotspur, Chelsea, and Watford all hold 100% records. Reigning champions Manchester City are in fifth, ahead of Bournemouth on goal difference, and Leicester City are seventh. West Ham United, the only Premier League team without a point, prop up the table. Newcastle United and Southampton are clear ahead of Burnley and Huddersfield Town in the relegation zone on goal difference. None of the teams relegated from the Premier League last season - Swansea City, West Bromwich Albion, and Stoke City - have managed to join the Championship promotion race yet and stand 10th, 11th, and 17th respectively. Leeds United and Middlesbrough take an early lead in the Championship and stand three points clear of third-placed Bolton Wanderers. Aston Villa, newly-promoted Blackburn Rovers, Derby County, and Sheffield United hold fourth to seventh place on 9 points each, with Derby only ahead of United because of alphabetical order. Reading (23rd) and Ipswich Town share joint bottom, while Birmingham City stand above Queens Park Rangers out of the relegation zone on goal difference.

30 September 2018: September closes with Manchester City leading Liverpool at the top of the Premier League, with goal difference still the margin between the leaders. Chelsea are third, Spurs and Arsenal are contesting fourth, and Watford and Bournemouth complete the top seven. Newcastle, Cardiff, and Huddersfield (20th) stand in the relegation zone with 2 points each. Championship top scorers West Brom have seized the lead in the second division, and stand a point in front of Leeds, Middlesbrough, and Sheffield United. Norwich City are fifth, and Brentford hold sixth over Swansea, Wigan Athletic, and Derby on goal difference. Preston North End have fallen to the bottom of the table, a point behind Millwall and Ipswich.

27 October 2018: Following a draw with West Ham United, Leicester City chairman Vichai Srivaddhanaprabha's helicopter crashed in a car park outside of King Power Stadium, Leicester City's home stadium. None of the five passengers survived, including Srivaddhanaprabha.

31 October 2018: As Halloween arrives, the top seven remains unchanged, save for Spurs and Arsenal exchanging places. Goal difference continues to be the difference between Manchester City and Liverpool. Cardiff have climbed out of the relegation zone, ahead of Fulham on goal difference, Newcastle have dropped to 19th, and Huddersfield remain bottom. Sheffield United have seized the lead of a congested Championship, with Leeds still second with two points less than their Yorkshire rivals. Middlesbrough and Norwich are behind Leeds only on goal difference, with West Brom and Derby two points behind them. However, six other teams are all within 3 points of the play-off places, including newly-promoted Blackburn and early strugglers QPR. Ipswich return to the foot of the table, 3 points behind Hull City (23rd) and Reading.

30 November 2018: Manchester City now hold a two-point lead over Liverpool, despite both teams remaining unbeaten. Spurs have climbed above Chelsea, who have only won 3 of their past 8 league games. Arsenal are fifth, 5 points clear of Everton, and it appears increasingly likely those 5 teams will be the contenders for Champions League qualification. Despite winning only once in November, Manchester United have climbed to 7th. Improved form has seen Newcastle and Huddersfield escape the bottom 3, and now Southampton (19th)and Fulham are joint bottom, with Burnley below Crystal Palace on goal difference to stand 18th. A competitive promotion race continues to gather pace in the Championship, with 3 points separating Norwich (1st), Leeds, Middlesbrough, West Brom, and Sheffield United (5th). Nottingham Forest have claimed 6th place ahead of arch-rivals Derby on goal difference. Despite appointing former Norwich boss Paul Lambert as manager, Ipswich remain bottom, 6 points adrift of safety. Reading (20th) and Millwall are out of the relegation zone ahead of Hull and Bolton on goal difference.

8 December 2018: Manchester City lose 2–0 at Chelsea, resulting their first defeat of the season. This also meant that Liverpool go top of the league after defeating Bournemouth 4–0 away.

18 December 2018: José Mourinho is sacked as manager of Manchester United after a poor start to the season left them in seventh place, nineteen points behind rivals Liverpool. Former Manchester United player Ole Gunnar Solskjær takes over as caretaker manager until the end of the season, on loan from Norwegian club Molde.

31 December 2018: 2018 ends with defending champions Manchester City dropping points and losing to Chelsea, Crystal Palace and Leicester City to give Liverpool a 7 point gap lead after winning every game in December. Tottenham Hotspur remains third despite losing to Arsenal and Wolverhampton Wanderers, and Chelsea drop to fourth, despite defeating Manchester City. Arsenal stays at fifth, and Ole Gunnar Solskjær's Manchester United rise to sixth in the table. In the Championship, Leeds United have a 3 point lead at the top above second-place Norwich City. West Bromwich Albion, Sheffield United, Middlesbrough and Derby County complete the promotion play off spots, with Middlesbrough ahead of Derby County only on goal difference. Ipswich Town remain bottom of the table, 5 points behind 23rd placed Reading and 7 points behind 22nd placed Rotherham United.

3 January 2019: The last undefeated team in England's top five divisions, Liverpool, lose 2–1 to Manchester City, preserving Arsenal's Invincibles record from the 2003–04 season.

11 January 2019: A spy was discovered at Derby County’s training ground before their game at Leeds. The whites won 2-0 later on the day.

21 January 2019: Cardiff City's record signing, Emiliano Sala was on board a Piper Malibu that disappeared near Alderney in the Channel Islands.

31 January 2019: The first month of 2019 concludes with Liverpool still top of the Premier League, though now only 5 points ahead of Manchester City. Spurs remain third, while Arsenal climb to fourth, with 2 points and a +4 goal difference the margin between them, Chelsea, and Manchester United. Wolves' return to the top flight continues to be a successful once as the Midlanders stand 7th, though only 4 points separate them from West Ham in 12th. Huddersfield are rooted to the foot of the table, 12 points adrift of 17th-placed Burnley, and look destined for a return to the Championship. Fulham (19th) and Cardiff are also some distance from safety. A tier below, Leeds still hold their 3-point buffer over Norwich. The top six in unchanged, except for Sheffield United climbing above West Brom. Meanwhile, Ipswich are still stuck at rock bottom, Reading are now in 22nd, a point behind Rotherham, and Bolton has dropped to 23rd.

22 February 2019: Chelsea are handed a transfer embargo by FIFA for the next two transfer windows for breaching rules in relation to youth players.

24 February 2019: Leicester City sack Claude Puel after losing 4–1 to Crystal Palace at home.

24 February 2019: Manchester City win the EFL Cup 4–3 on penalties against Chelsea. The final was overshadowed by Kepa Arrizabalaga refusing to be subbed out by Maurizio Sarri.

28 February 2019: Liverpool's lead has been cut to 1 point by Manchester City as February ends. Consecutive losses for Tottenham have thwarted their title ambitions and it now appears that they are in a race for Champions League qualification, with Arsenal, Manchester United and Chelsea all within 7 points of them. Wolves continue to hold the coveted 7th place, with Watford behind them only on goal difference. The bottom 3 remains unchanged, though Southampton and Brighton & Hove Albion are not far away. Norwich are now 2 points in front of the Championship title race, Leeds dropping to 3rd behind Sheffield United on goal difference. West Brom and Middlesbrough continue their play-off chase, but now they are joined by Bristol City in 6th, following a run of 7 wins in a row. Reading and Rotherham swap positions in an otherwise unchanged relegation zone.

3 March 2019:  Liverpool’s 0–0 draw with Everton in the Merseyside derby, coupled with Manchester City’s win at Bournemouth a day earlier, means that The Reds are not top of the League for the first time since December.

9 March 2019: West Brom, 4th in the Championship, sack Darren Moore after drawing 1–1 with bottom-club Ipswich.

10 March 2019: Jack Grealish is punched by a Birmingham City supporter during the Second City derby. Grealish scores the winner later on as Aston Villa won 1–0.

17 March 2019: Liverpool win 2–1 at Fulham to go top again, but City now have a game in hand.

22 March 2019: Birmingham City were given a 9-point penalty deduction for breaching Financial rules.

30 March 2019: Huddersfield Town become the first side in the top four divisions of English football to be relegated this season, after losing 2–0 to Crystal Palace.

31 March: Liverpool’s late victory over Tottenham puts them top of the league again by 2 points, but Manchester City still have a game in hand.

31 March 2019: As April arises, Liverpool remain top of the Premier League, but now have played a game more than Manchester City, who have the Manchester derby as their game in hand. Spurs, now very vulnerable, and Manchester United, now appointed Ole Gunnar Solkjaer permanently, complete the top four. Leicester, now managed by Brendan Rodgers, are closer to 7th placed Wolves and are alongside Watford for the race for that place. Huddersfield have become the second ever side (first since Derby in 2008) to get relegated from the Premier League before the end of March, and Fulham look likely in joining them in the Championship. Only Cardiff City have a realistic chance of surviving, while Burnley, Southampton, and Brighton aren’t safe yet. In the Championship, Norwich remain top, but Leeds reclaim 2nd place from Sheffield United after the Blades lost 3–2 at home to Bristol City and Leeds beat Millwall 3–2. Managerless West Brom were not too far off for promotion, but would have to hope both Yorkshire sides drop points. Middlesbrough have had a rotten month after losing nearly all of their matches in March, resulting them being outside the top six for the first time in 7 months. Aston Villa, meanwhile, have had a perfect March as their 5 wins in a row saw them in the playoffs for the first time since August. Completing the top six were Derby. The bottom three were still unchanged, but Ipswich look likely to go out of the Championship. Millwall are also in real danger of being sucked into the relegation zone, while Reading are now above the dotted line.

2 April 2019: Fulham join Huddersfield into the Championship after a 4–1 loss to Watford.

3 April 2019: The new Tottenham Hotspur Stadium finally hosts a football match as Crystal Palace became the first visitors to Spurs’ new ground. Heung-Ming Son was the first goalscorer on the new stadium as Tottenham won 2–0.

13 April: With promotion rivals, Mansfield and MK Dons dropping points, Lincoln City became the first EFL team to achieve promotion thanks to a 1–1 draw with Cheltenham. On the same day, Ipswich were relegated to the 3rd tier for the first time since 1957 after drawing 1–1 with Birmingham City.

19 April 2019: Bolton are relegated to League One after losing 2–0 to Aston Villa, who were on a club equalling 9 wins in a row.

22 April 2019: Aston Villa, who won 10 games in a row for the first time ever, and West Brom confirm their places in the playoffs.

24 April 2019: Manchester City defeat United 2–0 in the derby to go top again.

26 April 2019: The Football League confirm that the EFL Championship game between Bolton Wanderers and Brentford, scheduled to take place the following day at the University of Bolton Stadium, has been postponed due to a PFA approved strike by the Bolton players over unpaid wages owed to them by owner Ken Anderson. It is the first case of a game being postponed due to industrial action by the players in the 131-year history of the Football League. The EFL later confirmed Wanderers must fulfill their remaining fixtures against Brentford and Nottingham Forest, even if it means using U23 or U18 players. Few days later, on 3 May, Brentford were awarded a 1-0 win by the EFL.

27 April 2019: Rotherham are relegated after a year being promoted as they lost 2–1 at West Brom and Millwall drew with Stoke City. At the top, Sheffield United are all but promoted to the Premier League after a 2–0 win against relegated Ipswich. A few hours later, Norwich confirmed theirs with a 2–1 home victory over Blackburn. In the National League, Leyton Orient return to the EFL after drawing 0–0 with Braintree.

28 April 2018: Leeds’ 1–1 draw with Aston Villa confirms Sheffield United’s promotion.

30 April 2019: Luton Town and Barnsley are promoted without kicking a ball after Portsmouth and Sunderland both lost their games in hand.

4 May 2019: Cardiff are relegated to the Championship after losing 3–2 to Crystal Palace at home. This meant that the Premier League would be all English for the first time since 2011. Elsewhere, Liverpool win 3–2 at Newcastle to push the title race to the final day.

5 May 2019: Derby County beat Middlesbrough to the final playoff spot by defeating West Brom 3–1 on the final day.

6 May 2019: Vincent Kompany scores a rocket of a goal as Manchester City defeat Leicester to go to the final day top of the league.

12 May 2019: Manchester City win the Premier League after defeating Brighton 4–1 away, despite going behind and Liverpool winning 2–0 against Wolverhampton Wanderers. City become the first team to defend the title and win the league away from home since the 2008-09 and 2007-08 seasons respectively and also become the 13th team to do so to do the aforementioned.

18 May 2019: Manchester City complete the first ever English domestic quadruple of trophies (the Premier League, FA Cup, EFL Cup and Community Shield) by winning the FA Cup final at Wembley Stadium by beating Watford 6–0. That matches the record set by Bury against Derby County (also 6–0) as the biggest win margin in the final of the competition's history, back in 1903. This confirms next season's FA Community Shield to be between treble winners City and league runners-up Liverpool.

27 May 2019: Three years after getting relegated from the Premier League, Aston Villa win promotion back to the top division by winning the play-off final against Derby County 2-1.

1 June 2019: In the second ever all English UEFA Champions League final, Liverpool defeats Tottenham Hotspur 2–0 to win their sixth European Cup/UEFA Champions League and their first trophy since winning the EFL Cup in 2011-12.

New clubs
 Ossett United F.C. join the 2018–19 Northern Premier League Division One East.

Clubs removed
 Jarrow Roofing Boldon Community Association F.C. were closed down after relegation from the 2017–18 Northern Football League First Division (level 9).
 North Ferriby United A.F.C. wound up in March due to outstanding debts whilst playing in the Northern Premier League (level 7).
 Ossett Albion A.F.C. merged with Ossett Town to become Ossett United after competing in the 2017–18 Northern Premier League First Division North (level 8).
 Shaw Lane A.F.C. folded after finishing sixth in the Northern Premier League (level 7).
 Team Northumbria F.C. resigned after completing the 2017–18 Northern Football League First Division (level 9).
 Thurrock F.C. dissolved after competing in the 2017–18 Isthmian League Premier Division (level 7).

Deaths
 1 June 2018: Ryan Evans, 18, Mansfield Town forward.
 2 June 2018: John Ritchie, 70, Bradford City goalkeeper.
 4 June 2018: Gareth Williams, 76, Cardiff City, Bolton Wanderers and Bury midfielder.
 4 June 2018: Chris Weller, 78, Bournemouth and Bristol Rovers inside forward.
 10 June 2018: Stan Anderson, 85, England, Newcastle United, Sunderland and Middlesbrough midfielder, who also managed Middlesbrough, Queens Park Rangers, Doncaster Rovers and Bolton Wanderers.
 11 June 2018: John Shepherd, 86, Millwall, Brighton & Hove Albion and Gillingham centre forward.
 18 June 2018: Ron Healey, 65, Republic of Ireland, Manchester City and Cardiff City goalkeeper.
 20 June 2018: Ernie Hunt, 75, Swindon Town, Wolverhampton Wanderers, Everton, Coventry City, Doncaster Rovers and Bristol City forward.
 21 June 2018: Johnny Hubbard, MBE, 87, South Africa and Bury midfielder.
 28 June 2018: Goran Bunjevčević, 45, FR Yugoslavia and Tottenham Hotspur defender
 8 July 2018: Alan Gilzean, 79, Tottenham Hotspur forward.
 23 July 2018: Paul Madeley, 73, England and Leeds United defender.
 24 July 2018: Reginald Pickup, 88, Stoke City inside left.
 24 July 2018: Fred Donaldson, 81, Port Vale, Exeter City and Chester right-back.
 25 July 2018: Jimmy Collins, 80, Tottenham Hotspur and Brighton & Hove Albion inside forward.
 3 August 2018: Terry Bush, 75, Bristol City forward.
 3 August 2018: Cliff Huxford, 81, Chelsea, Southampton and Exeter City wing half.
 6 August 2018: Dennis Thrower, 80, Ipswich Town wing half.
 8 August 2018: Dave Hargreaves, 63, Blackburn Rovers striker, who also holds the overall goalscoring record for Accrington Stanley.
 20 August 2018: Jimmy McIlroy MBE, 86, Northern Ireland, Burnley, Stoke City and Oldham Athletic forward, who also managed Oldham and Bolton Wanderers.
 23 August 2018: Ron Hunt, 72, Queens Park Rangers defender.
 23 August 2018: Ted Bennett, 93, Great Britain, Queens Park Rangers and Watford goalkeeper.
24 August 2018: Gordon Riddick, 74, Luton Town, Gillingham and Brentford midfielder.
 27 August 2018: Ron Newman, 82, Portsmouth, Leyton Orient, Crystal Palace and Gillingham outside forward.
 11 September 2018: Edwin Davies, 72, Bolton Wanderers former owner and honorary president.
 12 September 2018: Ralph Prouton, 92, Swindon Town left half.
 16 September 2018: Kevin Beattie, 64, England, Ipswich Town, Colchester United and Middlesbrough defender.
 16 September 2018: Tommy Best, 97, Chester, Cardiff City and Queens Park Rangers forward.
 18 September 2018: Ernie Bateman, 89, Watford centre half.
 23 September 2018: Harry Walden, 77, Luton Town and Northampton Town midfielder.
 24 September 2018: Jim Brogan, 74, Scotland and Coventry City left back.
 26 September 2018: Joe Carolan, 81, Republic of Ireland, Manchester United and Brighton & Hove Albion left back.
 9 October 2018: Tony Hopper, 42, Carlisle United midfielder.
 11 October 2018: Sir Doug Ellis, OBE, 94, Aston Villa chairman for 24 years and life president of the club.
 15 October 2018: Charlie Crickmore, 76, Hull City, Bournemouth, Gillingham, Rotherham United, Norwich City and Notts County winger.
 17 October 2018: Geoff Scott, 61, Stoke City, Leicester City, Birmingham City, Charlton Athletic, Middlesbrough, Northampton Town and Cambridge United defender.
 27 October 2018: Vichai Srivaddhanaprabha, 60, Leicester City owner and chairman.
 31 October 2018: Ken Shellito, 78, England and Chelsea full back, who also managed Chelsea and Cambridge United.
 9 November 2018: Roger Hoy, 71, Tottenham Hotspur, Crystal Palace, Luton Town and Cardiff City defender.
 13 November 2018: David Stewart, 71, Scotland, Leeds United and Swansea City goalkeeper.
 17 November 2018: Barrie Betts, 86, Barnsley, Stockport County, Manchester City and Scunthorpe United defender.
 17 November 2018: Jim Iley, 82, Sheffield United, Tottenham Hotspur, Nottingham Forest, Newcastle United and Peterborough United left half, who also managed Peterborough, Barnsley, Blackburn Rovers, Bury and Exeter City.
 19 November 2018: George Yardley, 76, Luton Town and Tranmere Rovers goalkeeper/forward.
 20 November 2018: Gordon Morritt, 76, Rotherham United, Doncaster Rovers, Northampton Town, York City, Rochdale and Darlington goalkeeper.
 23 November 2018: Kevin Austin, 45, Trinidad & Tobago, Leyton Orient, Lincoln City, Barnsley, Cambridge United, Bristol Rovers, Swansea City and Chesterfield defender.
 25 November 2018: Graham Williams, 81, Wales, Bradford City, Everton, Swansea City, Wrexham, Tranmere Rovers and Port Vale winger.
 26 November 2018: Johnny Hart, 90, Manchester City inside forward, who also managed the club.
 26 November 2018: Darren Pitcher, 49, Charlton Athletic and Crystal Palace midfielder.
 15 December 2018: Dušan Nikolić, 65, Yugoslavia and Bolton Wanderers midfielder.
 18 December 2018: Bill Slater  , 91, England, Great Britain, Blackpool, Brentford and Wolverhampton Wanderers inside forward.
 20 December 2018: Colin Barlow, 83, Manchester City, Oldham Athletic and Doncaster Rovers winger.
 26 December 2018: Mike Metcalf, 79, Wrexham and Chester striker.
 27 December 2018: Brian Jordan, 86, Rotherham United, Middlesbrough and York City half back.
 28 December 2018: Peter Hill-Wood, 82, Arsenal chairman for over thirty years between 1982 and 2013.
 31 December 2018: Peter Thompson, 76, England, Preston North End, Liverpool and Bolton Wanderers winger.
 3 January 2019: Reg Holland, 78, Wrexham and Chester full back.
 13 January 2019: Phil Masinga, 49, South Africa and Leeds United striker.
 14 January 2019: Duncan Welbourne, 78, Grimsby Town, Watford and Southport full back.
21 January 2019: Emiliano Sala, 28, Cardiff City striker.
 24 January 2019: Nigel Saddington, 53, Doncaster Rovers, Sunderland and Carlisle United defender.
 24 January 2019: Johnny Walker, 90, Wolverhampton Wanderers, Southampton and Reading inside forward.
 27 January 2019: Mike Harrison, 78, Chelsea, Blackburn Rovers, Plymouth Argyle and Luton Town winger.
 28 January 2019: Arthur Turner, 98, Charlton Athletic and Colchester United forward.
 31 January 2019: Dennis Hunt, 81, Gillingham and Brentford left back.
 3 February 2019: Danny Williams, 94, Rotherham United inside forward, who also managed Rotherham, Swindon Town, Sheffield Wednesday and Mansfield Town.
 4 February 2019: Matt Brazier, 42, Queens Park Rangers, Fulham, Cardiff City and Leyton Orient midfielder.
 5 February 2019: Joe Fascione, 74, Chelsea winger.
 8 February 2019: Cliff Myers, 72, Charlton Athletic, Brentford and Torquay United utility player.
 9 February 2019: Mick Kennedy, 57, Republic of Ireland, Halifax Town, Huddersfield Town, Middlesbrough, Portsmouth, Bradford City, Leicester City, Luton Town, Stoke City, Chesterfield and Wigan Athletic midfielder.
 9 February 2019: Fred Pickering, 78, England, Blackburn Rovers, Everton, Birmingham City and Blackpool forward.
 9 February 2019: Ian Ross, 72, Liverpool, Aston Villa, Peterborough United and Hereford United defender, who also managed Huddersfield Town.
 12 February 2019: Gordon Banks, OBE, 81, England, Chesterfield, Leicester City and Stoke City goalkeeper, part of England's World Cup winning team of 1966.
 13 February 2019: Eric Harrison, MBE, 81, Halifax Town, Hartlepools United, Barrow and Southport wing half, who later became a prominent youth coach at Manchester United.
 26 February 2019: Bobby Doyle, 65, Barnsley, Peterborough United, Blackpool, Portsmouth and Hull City midfielder.
 28 February 2019: Peter Dolby, 78, Shrewsbury Town centre half.
 15 March 2019: Derek Lewin, 88, Great Britain Olympian who played for Oldham Athletic in the Football League.
 15 March 2019: Ron Peplow, 83, Brentford wing half.
 15 March 2019: Michael Thalassitis, 26, Stevenage striker.
 c.21 March 2019: John Steeples, 59, Grimsby Town forward.
 25 March 2019: Barrie Hole, 76, Wales, Cardiff City, Blackburn Rovers, Aston Villa and Swansea City midfielder.
 26 March 2019: Ted Burgin, 91, Sheffield United, Doncaster Rovers, Leeds United and Rochdale goalkeeper.
 28 March 2019: Kevin Randall, 73, Bury, Chesterfield, Notts County, Mansfield Town and York City striker, who also managed York City and Chesterfield and coached at a number of clubs.
 April 2019: Kit Napier, 75, Blackpool, Preston North End, Workington, Newcastle United, Brighton & Hove Albion and Blackburn Rovers forward.
 12 April 2019: Ivor Broadis, 96, England, Carlisle United, Sunderland, Manchester City and Newcastle United inside forward, who also managed Carlisle United.
 12 April 2019: Tommy Smith, MBE, 74, England, Liverpool and Swansea City defender.
 14 April 2019: Colin Collindridge, 98, Sheffield United, Nottingham Forest and Coventry City forward.
 22 April 2019: Billy McNeill, MBE, 79, first British captain to lift the European Cup in 1967, he later managed Manchester City and Aston Villa.
 23 April 2019: George Haigh, 103, Stockport County defender.
 23 April 2019: Peter Skipper, 61, Hull City, Darlington, Oldham Athletic, Walsall, Wrexham and Wigan Athletic defender.
 10 May 2019: Gordon Neate, 78, Reading full back, who later served the club as groundsman.
 11 May 2019: Jon Gittens, 55, Southampton, Swindon Town, Middlesbrough, Portsmouth, Torquay United and Exeter City defender.
 11 May 2019: Alan Skirton, 80, Arsenal, Blackpool, Bristol City and Torquay United winger.
 16 May 2019: Geoff Toseland, 87, Sunderland winger.
 26 May 2019: Harry Hood, 74, Sunderland forward.
 27 May 2019: Alan Smith, 97, Arsenal, Brentford and Leyton Orient outside left.
1 June 2019: José Antonio Reyes, 35, Arsenal winger.

Retirements 

 27 July 2018: Carl Ikeme, 32, former Nigeria and Wolverhampton Wanderers goalkeeper.
 30 July 2018: Liam Rosenior, 34, former Bristol City, Fulham, Reading, Hull City and Brighton & Hove Albion full back.
 31 July 2018: Jon Meades, 26, former Cardiff City, Bournemouth, Oxford United and A.F.C. Wimbledon defender.
 16 August 2018: Henri Camara, 41, former Senegal, Wolverhampton Wanderers, Southampton, Wigan Athletic, West Ham United, Stoke City and Sheffield United striker.
 22 August 2018: Steve Sidwell, 35, former Brentford, Reading, Chelsea, Aston Villa, Fulham, Stoke City and Brighton & Hove Albion midfielder.
24 August 2018: Grant Holt, 37, former Halifax Town, Sheffield Wednesday, Rochdale, Nottingham Forest, Blackpool, Shrewsbury Town, Norwich City, Wigan Athletic, Aston Villa, Huddersfield Town, Wolverhampton Wanderers, King's Lynn Town and Barrow striker.
28 August 2018: Luke Wilkshire, 36, former Australia, Middlesbrough and Bristol City defender.
 29 August 2018: Clint Dempsey, 35, former United States, Fulham and Tottenham Hotspur forward.
 6 September 2018: Abdoul Camara, 28, former Guinea and Derby County winger.
 12 September 2018: Lenny Pidgeley, 34, former Chelsea, Millwall, Carlisle United, Bradford City, Exeter City and Newport County goalkeeper.
 18 September 2018: Stephen Darby, 29, former Liverpool, Bradford City and Bolton Wanderers defender.
 20 September 2018: Graham Stack, 36, former Arsenal, Reading, Plymouth Argyle, Barnet and Eastleigh goalkeeper.
 7 October 2018: John Terry, 37, former England, Chelsea and Aston Villa defender.
 16 October 2018: Zander Diamond, 33, former Oldham Athletic, Burton Albion, Northampton Town and Mansfield Town defender.
 17 October 2018: David Cotterill, 30, former Wales, Bristol City, Wigan Athletic, Sheffield United, Swansea City, Barnsley, Doncaster Rovers and Birmingham City winger.
 25 October 2018: Robin van Persie, 36, former Netherlands, Arsenal and Manchester United striker.
 13 November 2018: Joe Cole, 37, former England, West Ham United, Chelsea, Liverpool, Aston Villa and Coventry City midfielder.
 21 November 2018: Didier Drogba, 40, former Ivory Coast and Chelsea striker.
 26 November 2018: Leon Barnett, 32, former Luton Town, West Bromwich Albion, Norwich City, Wigan Athletic, Bury and Northampton Town defender.
 3 December 2018: Andrey Arshavin, 37, former Russia and Arsenal midfielder.
 5 January 2019: Brian Stock, 37, former Wales, AFC Bournemouth, Preston North End, Doncaster Rovers, Burnley and Havant & Waterlooville midfielder.
 7 January 2019: Adrian Leijer, 32, former Australia and Norwich City defender.
 11 January 2019: Robert Huth, 34, former Germany, Chelsea, Middlesbrough, Stoke City and Leicester City defender.
 21 January 2019: Glen Johnson, 34, former England, West Ham United, Chelsea, Portsmouth, Liverpool and Stoke City right back.
 30 January 2019: Kalifa Cissé, 35, former Mali, Reading, Bristol City and Derby County defender.
 4 February 2019: Zavon Hines, 30, former West Ham United, Burnley, Bradford City, Dagenham & Redbridge, Southend United and Chesterfield winger.
 5 February 2019: Joe Thompson, 29, former Rochdale, Tranmere Rovers, Bury and Carlisle United midfielder.
 7 February 2019: Chris Baird, 36, former Northern Ireland, Southampton, Fulham, Reading, Burnley, West Bromwich Albion and Derby County defender/midfielder.
 25 February 2019: Abou Diaby, 32, former France and Arsenal midfielder.
 25 February 2019:  Andrea Orlandi, 34, former Swansea City, Brighton & Hove Albion and Blackpool midfielder.
 8 March 2019: Emmanuel Frimpong, 27, former Ghana, Arsenal and Barnsley midfielder.
 22 March 2019: Jonathan Walters, 35, former Republic of Ireland, Bolton Wanderers, Hull City, Wrexham, Chester City, Ipswich Town, Stoke City and Burnley forward.
 22 March 2019: Fraser Franks, 28, former AFC Wimbledon, Welling United, Luton Town, Stevenage and Newport County defender.
 27 March 2019: Gabriel Agbonlahor, 32, former England and Aston Villa striker.
 28 March 2019: Tim Cahill, 39, former Australia, Millwall and Everton forward/midfielder.
 11 April 2019: Yossi Benayoun, 38, former Israel, West Ham United, Liverpool, Chelsea, Arsenal and Queens Park Rangers midfielder.
 4 May 2019: Danny Grainger, 32, former Carlisle United left back.
 4 May 2019: Matthew Taylor, 37, former Luton Town, Portsmouth, Bolton Wanderers, West Ham United, Burnley, Northampton Town and Swindon Town midfielder.
 5 May 2019: John O'Shea, 38, former Republic of Ireland, Manchester United, Sunderland and Reading defender.
 7 May 2019: Darren O'Dea, 32, former Republic of Ireland and Blackpool defender.
 10 May 2019: Yaya Toure, 35, former Ivory Coast and Manchester City midfielder.
 12 May 2019: Bruno, 38, former Brighton & Hove Albion right back.
 16 May 2019: David Mirfin, 34, former Huddersfield Town, Scunthorpe United, Watford and Mansfield Town centre half.
 25 May 2019: David Pipe, 35, former Wales, Coventry City, Notts County and Newport County midfielder.
 27 May 2019: Ashley Cole, 38, former England, Arsenal, Chelsea and Derby County left back.
 29 May 2019: Petr Čech, 36, former Czech Republic, Chelsea and Arsenal goalkeeper.
 31 May 2019: Robert Green, 39, former England, Norwich City, West Ham United, Queens Park Rangers and Leeds United goalkeeper.

References

 
English
2018 sport-related lists